Srch is a municipality and village in Pardubice District in the Pardubice Region of the Czech Republic. It has about 1,700 inhabitants.

Administrative parts
Villages of Hrádek and Pohránov are administrative parts of Srch.

References

External links

 

Villages in Pardubice District